Bonham Norton (1565–1635), was a politician and King's Printer to James I.

He was the son of William Norton. He became King's Printer after his cousin John Norton reassigned to another project for James I and became sheriff of Shropshire in 1611.

He was buried at Old St Paul's Cathedral.  His widow Jane, daughter of Judge Thomas Owen (died 1598), also erected a monument in Condover church, Shropshire, in 1641, portraying her kneeling facing her husband.

References

1565 births
1635 deaths
16th-century printers
English printers
17th-century printers
16th-century English people
17th-century English people
High Sheriffs of Shropshire